The 1999 Walsall Metropolitan Borough Council election took place on 6 May 1999 to elect members of Walsall Metropolitan Borough Council in the West Midlands, England. One third of the council was up for election and the Labour party gained overall control of the council from no overall control.

After the election, the composition of the council was
Labour 31
Conservative 21
Liberal Democrat 6
Independent 2

Election result

References

1999 English local elections
1999
1990s in the West Midlands (county)